The Albany Division is a railroad division operated by CSX Transportation in the U.S. states of Massachusetts, New Jersey, New York and Pennsylvania. The Albany Division comprises 28 subdivisions.

Subdivisions list  
The subdivisions within the Albany Division are as follows:
 Baldwinsville Subdivision
 Belt Subdivision
 Berkshire Subdivision
 Boston Subdivision
 Buffalo Terminal Subdivision
 Carman Subdivision
 Castleton Subdivision
 Fair Grounds Subdivision
 Fitchburg Subdivision
 Framingham Subdivision
 Fulton Subdivision
 Hudson Subdivision
 Lockport Subdivision
 Middleboro Subdivision
 Mohawk Subdivision
 Montreal Subdivision
 Niagara Subdivision
 Port Subdivision
 Post Road Subdivision
 River Subdivision
 Rochester Subdivision
 St. Lawrence Subdivision
 Schodack Subdivision
 Selkirk Subdivision
 Somerset Railroad Subdivision
 Syracuse Terminal Subdivision
 Trenton Subdivision
 West Shore Subdivision

See also
 List of CSX Transportation lines

References

CSX Transportation lines